Computational History (not to be confused with computation history), sometimes also called Histoinformatics, is a multidisciplinary field that studies history through machine learning and other data-driven, computational approaches.

See also

References

Historiography